Niou is a department or commune of Kourwéogo Province in central  Burkina Faso. Its capital lies at the town of Niou. According to the 1996 census the department has a total population of 26,977.

Towns and villages
 Niou	(1 793 inhabitants) (capital)
 Belé	(371 inhabitants)
 Garga	(933 inhabitants)
 Gasgo	(380 inhabitants)
 Goabga	(2 041 inhabitants)
 Kouka	(1 479 inhabitants)
 Koukin	(2 472 inhabitants)
 Mouni	(1 750 inhabitants)
 Nabzinigma	(320 inhabitants)
 Napalgué	(2 789 inhabitants)
 Niapa	(543 inhabitants)
 Niou-yarcé	(635 inhabitants)
 Raongo	(1 186 inhabitants)
 Sakouli	(1 530 inhabitants)
 Sondogtenga	(620 inhabitants)
 Sourou	(1 161 inhabitants)
 Tamsé	(900 inhabitants)
 Tanghin	(1 886 inhabitants)
 Tangseghin	(1 151 inhabitants)
 Wa	(1 457 inhabitants)
 Zeguedeghin	(1 580 inhabitants)

References

Departments of Burkina Faso
Kourwéogo Province